Vaccinieae is a tribe of over 1000 species in the plant family Ericaceae. The tribe consists of morphologically diverse woody plants. Species within Vaccinieae can be found on all continents except Australia and Antarctica. Genetic analysis indicates that Vaccinieae is not a monophyletic group.

Genera
Agapetes - Anthopteropsis - Anthopterus - Calopteryx - Cavendishia - Ceratostema - Costera - Demosthenesia - Didonica - Dimorphanthera - Diogenesia - Disterigma - Gaylussacia - Gonocalyx - Laterospora - Macleania - Mycerinus - Notopora - Oreanthes - Orthaea - Paphia - Pellegrinia - Periclesia - Plutarchia - Polyclita - Psammisia - Rusbya - Satyria - Semiramisia - Siphonandra - Sphyrospermum -  Themistoclesia - Thibaudia - Utleya - Vaccinium

References

Bibliography

External links

Vaccinioideae
Asterid tribes
Taxa named by Ludwig Reichenbach